The Special Rapporteur on the occupied Palestinian territories, formally the Special Rapporteur on the situation of human rights in the Palestinian territories occupied since 1967 is a Special Rapporteur who works for the United Nations and reports on the human rights situation in the occupied Palestinian territories. The mandate was established in 1993 by the former Commission on Human Rights.

Post-holders
Francesca Albanese (Italy) was appointed in 2022 to take up the post of Special Rapporteur.

Previous Special Rapporteurs were:

Michael Lynk
(Canada), 2016 - 2022

Makarim Wibisono
(Indonesia), 2014 - 2016

Richard Falk
(United States of America), 2008-2014

John Dugard
(South Africa), 2001-2008

Giorgio Giacomelli
(Italy), 1999-2001

Hannu Halinen
(Finland), 1995-1999

René Felber
(Switzerland), 1993-1995

References

 
Palestinian territories
Israeli-occupied territories
Human rights